IgA protease (IgA-specific serine endopeptidase, IgA proteinase, IgA-specific proteinase, immunoglobulin A protease, immunoglobulin A proteinase) is an enzyme. This enzyme catalyses the following chemical reaction[reaction equation needed]

It performs cleavage of immunoglobulin A molecules at certain Pro- bonds in the hinge region. No small molecule substrates are known

This enzyme is secreted by Gram-negative bacteria Neisseria gonorrhoeae, Neisseria meningitidis, Haemophilus influenzae, and Gram-positive Streptococcus pneumoniae.

The action of IgA protease allows the above mentioned bacteria to adhere to mucous membranes.

An IgA protease is a highly specific 106kDa enzyme that cleaves amino acid sequences of certain proteins. The natural substrate of IgA proteases is immunoglobulin A, hence its name. The enzyme is in fact capable of cleavage of proteins with the amino acid sequence Cleaves N-X-Z-Pro-Pro/-Y-Pro-C, where the X in the sequence preferably is a Proline or Serine; the Y = Threonine, Serine or Alanine; and Z preferably is Arginine or Threonine. Because of the sequence that the enzyme is able to cleave, it is also called IgAse Pro-Pro-Y-Pro. Thus, the IgA protease act by cleaving the proline-rich hinge region of the heavy chain of IgA1. Three major bacteria, Neisseria meningitidis, Streptococcus pneumoniae, and Haemophilus influenzae type B, release the IgA protease which destroys IgA.

See also 
 Immunoglobulin A

References

External links 
 

EC 3.4.21
Proteases